Henry Hollow is a valley in Ste. Genevieve County in the U.S. state of Missouri.

Henry Hollow bears the name of an early settler.

References

Valleys of Ste. Genevieve County, Missouri
Valleys of Missouri